Dalibarda repens (dewdrop, false violet, star violet, Robin runaway. French Canadian: dalibarde rampante) is a perennial plant (a forb) in the rose family, native to eastern and central Canada and to the northeastern and north-central United States. It is the only species in the genus Dalibarda, which is closely allied with the genus Rubus (brambles, blackberries, raspberries). The species is often included in the genus Rubus as Rubus repens (L.) Kuntze. It is fairly easily grown in shady locations in damp to wet, acidic soils, and is frequently used in wildflower and bog gardens as a ground-cover.

Description
Dalibarda repens is a herbaceous plant with simple leaves, and hairy stems. It is the only species in the genus Dalibarda.  It has both sterile and fertile flowers.  The sterile flowers are much less numerous than the fertile ones, have five white petals and are borne atop a peduncle.  The more numerous fertile flowers are cleistogamous (they are self-pollinating and never open), and are hidden beneath the leaves. The flower stalks (peduncles) of the cleistogamous flowers are short, 2–5 cm long, and curved downward. The calyx forms a shallow, hairy hypanthium, which is divided into 5–6 lobes of unequal size, the 3 larger lobes are toothed (serrate).

The stem is decumbent/creeping, "several inches" in length, with a densely tufted terminal portion which bears both leaves and flowers.

The leaves are basal, simple, pinnately veined above the base, long-petiolate, and slightly hairy/downy on both sides. They are dark green in color. Leaf blades cordate to rounded (orbicular), 3–5 cm long; the basal lobes are rounded; the apex is blunt to rounded; the margins are scalloped, with low rounded teeth (crenate); and the petioles are hairy, 3–10 cm long.

The common name false violet comes not only from the heart-shaped leaves, but also because this plant, like violets, produces two kinds of flowers.

Though this plant is globally secure, it is locally endangered in Connecticut, New Jersey, North Carolina and Rhode Island.  It is listed as threatened in Michigan and Ohio.

The plant can be identified as being low, spreading by runners with leaves and flowers arising on separate stalks from the runner. The sterile flowers are white with 5 broad petals and numerous long stamens, solitary on a long, reddish flower stalk arising from runner. Leaves are kidney-shaped, with a long petiole, and with outer margin scalloped. The plant is 2 to 5 inches in height.

The leaves of dewdrop may be confused with violet leaves, but violets have low rounded teeth that curve upward; the leaf margins of dewdrop have low scalloped edges or outward-facing blunt teeth.

The plant is found in Minnesota in the west to Nova Scotia in the east, southward to Michigan, Pennsylvania and New Jersey, and in the mountains to North Carolina.

Dewdrop is found in northern or upland forests, in shady locations, in moist to wet conifer and mixedwood (softwoods and hardwoods) forests or swamps, and often on red pine and white pine sites with sandy, acidic soils.  It thrives best in acidic soils.

A few, nearly dry, small white drupes (drupelets), 3–4 mm long, retained within the calyx are produced.

As with its close relatives the Rubus, the young plants make a reasonably palatable pot-herb, and can be brewed as a mild infusion/tea throughout the growing season. The fruit is edible, but decidedly not "choice".

It flowers from June to August.

References

External links
United States Department of Agriculture PlantsProfile
Connecticut Botanical Society

Northern Ontario Plant Database; entry for Rubus repens

Dalibarda
Monotypic Rosaceae genera
Flora of the United States
Flora of Canada